Ed Lucht (born 6 November 1931) is a Canadian basketball player. He competed in the men's tournament at the 1956 Summer Olympics.

References

External links
 

1931 births
Living people
Canadian men's basketball players
1959 FIBA World Championship players
Olympic basketball players of Canada
Basketball players at the 1956 Summer Olympics
People from Westlock County
Basketball people from Alberta